The  is a motorcycle endurance race held at the Suzuka Circuit in Japan each year.  The race runs for eight hours consecutively and entrants are composed of two or more riders who alternate during pitstops.

History
The race began in 1978 as a race for prototype Tourist Trophy Formula One (TT-F1) motorcycles which meant the big four Japanese companies (Honda, Kawasaki, Suzuki and Yamaha), who had unlimited engineering resources, could use them on the track.

Throughout the years, the race had gone through several rule changes in accordance to the FIM, including the restriction to 750cc for F1 bikes.

One major change for the race came in 1993.  Due to the high popularity of Superbike racing, which had been a support class in previous 8 Hours races, the race now centered on superbikes.  The Formula One class, which at the time was the pinnacle of the race, would be removed altogether.  Another category included in the race is the Naked class (for motorcycles without fairings - similar to the streetfighter bikes).

At the event's peak during the 1980s, the race attracted in excess of 130,000 spectators while presently it attracts a crowd around 85,000. The record attendance figure is 160,000 in 1990.  The race is part of the FIM Endurance World Championship for motorcycles and with the exception of 2005, due to the high importance the big four Japanese manufacturers place on the race, the governing bodies set a race date that avoids conflict with any of the other major championship races.

Star riders
A main attraction of the Suzuka 8 hours race is that it normally features star riders from MotoGP and Superbike racing factions from around the world. It is not uncommon for a rider to have the 8 Hours race written into their contracts when they acquire a factory ride in MotoGP or Superbike. If the rider has notable success in their respective class during the season, they will usually negotiate to have the requirement of racing future 8 Hours races removed from their contract. Most high-level riders don't like racing it because it breaks up their mid-season momentum and because it is physically draining. Michael Doohan is an example of one such rider who raced the 8 Hours early in his career but had his contractual obligations to the race removed following his significant success in 500cc (now MotoGP).

On the other hand, high-level Japanese riders return for the race annually as it is regarded by the Japanese as one of the biggest motorsport events on the calendar. As the Suzuka 8 hours is part of the FIM World Endurance Racing Championship, its priority on the international calendar, along with the off-weeks in the FIM calendar, makes this race one of the most crucial on the schedule.

Until the removal of the Laguna Seca round in MotoGP, from 2003 until 2014, race winners had almost been exclusively Japanese, with only an occasional international-level star in the race, primarily since the Laguna Seca round either conflicted with the 8 Hours or was days after the event.  From 2002-2014, only World Superbike stars have participated in the event, and four European riders have won, with the 2013 three-rider team consisting mostly of European riders.

Since Laguna Seca was removed, MotoGP stars have once again participated in the race, as Yamaha has won with  Bradley Smith in 2015, along with Katsuyuki Nakasuga, who was a MotoGP rider at the time, and MotoGP rider Pol Espargaró, the 2013 Moto2 champion. Double MotoGP champion Casey Stoner also came out of retirement that year to race for Honda, alongside Michael van der Mark and Takumi Takahashi. His team was leading the race until Stoner crashed out when his throttle stuck open, resulting in a fractured tibia and shoulder for the Australian. Espargaró and Nakasuga (now just a Yamaha test driver in addition to domestic racing in Japan) repeated the feat in 2016 with Alex Lowes as the third rider. Nakasuga won the race third time in a row in 2017 with Alex Lowes and Michael van der Mark, marking him the second driver to win three consecutive endurance races, after Aaron Slight achieved the feat in the 1990s.

Winners

By manufacturer

References

External links
Suzuka 8 hours Official Website
Suzuka Circuit Website - English version
2009 Suzuka 8 hours results
Suzuka 8 hours - TBS Channel site
Suzuka 8 hours Site
Moto Race Japan year by year results

Motorcycle races
Motorsport competitions in Japan
Endurance motor racing
Sports competitions in Mie Prefecture